The Maintal–Dörnigheim Ferry, also known as the Mühlheim am Main to Dörnigheim Ferry, was a vehicular cable ferry across the Main river in Hesse, Germany. The ferry crossed between the Dörnigheim district of the town of Maintal, on the right bank of the river, and Mühlheim am Main opposite. On June 25, 2020, the ferry was permanently retired.

External links

References 

Transport in Hesse
Main (river) basin
Cable ferries in Germany
Trolley ferries